Nebria crassicornis is a species of ground beetle from Nebriinae subfamily that can be found in such US states as Montana and Washington.

References

crassicornis
Beetles described in 1925
Beetles of North America
Endemic fauna of the United States